Bandh Nylon Che (Marathi: बंध नायलॉन चे) is a 2016 Marathi language family drama film directed by Jatin Wagle. Presented by Maharashtra Times & Zero Hits and produced by Sunil Chandrika Nair and Siji Nair. Bandh Nylon Che features an ensemble cast of Mahesh Manjrekar, Medha Manjrekar, Subodh Bhave, Sunil Barve, Shruti Marathe, Sanjay Narvekar and Pranjal Parab in lead roles. Mahesh Manjrekar and Medha Manjrekar will be acting together for the very first time on a silver screen and that too in a double role. This film is based on an award-winning one-act play by the same name.

Teaser poster of the film was unveiled on 11 November 2015, and Official poster was released on 20 November 2015 which met with very good response. The film released on 29 January 2016.

Cast
Mahesh Manjrekar as Raghunath Balwant Jogalekar (Appa)
Medha Manjrekar as Mangal Raghunath Jogalekar
Subodh Bhave as Devdatta Raghunath  Jogalekar
Sunil Barve as Ravi
Sanjay Narvekar as Ram Jadhav
Shruti Marathe as Anita Jogalekar
Pranjal Parab as Sara Joglekar

Soundtrack
Music for this film is composed by Amitraj  while lyrics are penned by Mandar Cholkar.

Track listing

References

External links

2010s Marathi-language films